Stroganov School (Строгановская школа in Russian) is a conventional name for the last major Russian icon-painting school, which thrived under the patronage of the fabulously rich Stroganov family of merchants in the late 16th and 17th century.

"Stroganov School" owes its name to frequent mentioning of the Stroganovs on the markings on the back of the icons of Yemelyan Moskvitin, Stefan Pakhirya, Prokopy Chirin, Istoma, Nazariy, and Nikifor Saviny. Most of these icon painters, however, did not belong to the Stroganov School. They were icon painters from Moscow and executed commissions by the tsar. Many of their works were eventually acquired by the Stroganovs, who had been known as connoisseurs of sophisticated craftsmanship. 

The works of art of the Stroganov School have quite a few features in common, such as small size, exquisite diminutiveness, refined palette (mostly achieved with half-tints, golden, and silver colors), density of paint layers, graphic precision of details, fragile and somewhat pretentious delicacy of characters' postures and gestures, richness of their vestments, and complicated fantasy of landscape background.

References
Igor Grabar History of Russian Art, available online at

External links

Russian art movements
Eastern Orthodox icons
Russian icon painters
Icon-painting schools